Jacques (Jack) Steiner (1903 – 17 December 1968) was a Swiss footballer who played for FC Basel. He played in the position as midfielder. Steiner joined the Basel first team in 1925.

In the two seasons 1925/26 and 1926/27 Steiner played a total of six games for Basel without scoring a goal. Four of these games were in the Swiss Serie A and two were friendly games. His domestic league debut was on 18 October 1925 in the Landhof against Grenchen which Basel won 1–0.

References

Sources
 Rotblau: Jahrbuch Saison 2017/2018. Publisher: FC Basel Marketing AG. 
 Die ersten 125 Jahre. Publisher: Josef Zindel im Friedrich Reinhardt Verlag, Basel. 
 Verein "Basler Fussballarchiv" Homepage

FC Basel players
Swiss men's footballers
Association football midfielders
1903 births
1968 deaths